SNN: Showbiz News Ngayon (SNN: Showbiz News Now/Today) is a Philippine primetime entertainment news program broadcast by ABS-CBN and was presented by Boy Abunda and Kris Aquino, though Aquino was later replaced by Bianca Gonzalez because of her brother's campaign for presidency. The show premiered on February 16, 2009, replacing Pinoy Fear Factor. On September 9, 2011, SNN aired its final broadcast after 2 years and was replaced by Nasaan Ka, Elisa?.

On February 10, 2014, almost 3 years after SNN ended, a similar format of the show, this time focusing on everyday issues involved in the country and inside stories on every known personality, was formed. The original hosts of SNN reunited in the new show called Aquino & Abunda Tonight.

Format
The show begins with a news segment identified as the topic of the evening's poll question, which home viewers can vote for through text messaging. The results of the informal poll is revealed at the end of the show. On its first year, a new segment, "Isang Tanong, Isang Sagot," was introduced. It aims to answer showbiz questions taken from Twitter and Facebook followers of the show on or before the show ends.

Cast

Main anchors
 Boy Abunda 
 Bianca Gonzalez

Reporters
 Mario Dumaual
 Gretchen Fullido
 Cesca Litton
 Ginger Conejero
 MJ Felipe

Former anchors
 Kris Aquino

Fill-in anchors
 Toni Gonzaga 
 Mariel Rodriguez

Production
The Buzz hosts Boy Abunda and Kris Aquino were placed as the new anchors of this program and it aired its first episode on February 16, 2009. During this time, their morning talk show Boy & Kris was at the peak of the ratings game. Once they were tapped as the new anchors, the talk show was then placed by another with Ruffa Gutierrez and Ai-Ai delas Alas as the new hosts in the show Ruffa & Ai.

In 2010, Kris Aquino decided to take a leave from SNN to campaign for her brother Noynoy Aquino who is running for the presidency, during which time Toni Gonzaga, Mariel Rodriguez and Bianca Gonzalez were guest anchors. Aquino announced that she will be leaving SNN and The Buzz near the end of June to spend time with her family and not cause issues while her brother is in office as president. In 2010, Bianca Gonzalez, who was a guest host and temporary fill-in for Aquino, permanently replaced her to join Abunda. On September 9, 2011, SNN aired its final broadcast as Boy Abunda will now join Bandila.

Awards
23rd PMPC Star Awards for Television: Best Showbiz-Oriented Show
Boy Abunda for "Best Male Showbiz-Oriented Talk Show Host" in the 23rd PMPC Star Awards for TV

See also
List of programs broadcast by ABS-CBN

References

External links
Official website

ABS-CBN original programming
Philippine television talk shows
Entertainment news shows in the Philippines
2009 Philippine television series debuts
2011 Philippine television series endings
Filipino-language television shows